Dimitar Avramovski–Pandilov (aka Dimitar Pandilov; 1 March 1898, in Tresonče – 26 July 1963) is considered the first impressionist painter, the founder of modern Macedonian art.  He died at the Skopje earthquake in 1963.

Education and career
Born in Tresonče, in the Manastir Vilayet of the Ottoman Empire, he finished his studies in Sofia, Bulgaria. From 1928 to 1943 he lived in the village of Hayredin in Bulgaria, working as an art teacher. After the occupation of Yugoslav Macedonia from Bulgaria during WWII, he returned to his homeland. Pandilov cooperates with the Bulgarian authorities and was a mayor of the village of Smilevo and then of Kukurečani. After the War he became a teacher at the Skopje high school "Josip Broz Tito". He was one of the founders of the Association of the painters of Macedonia.

Painting style
The style of his soft, warm and lyrical palette fluctuates between poetic realism and neo-impressionism. His paintings include scenes from traditional life, landscapes, urban panoramas, still lifes, portraits and nudes. He was the first Macedonian painter with an academic degree who departed from the fresco-painting tradition.

Accomplishments
He was the first Macedonian impressionists whose exhibition in 1926, chronologically, begins modern art in North Macedonia. As an artist and pedagogue he made a considerable contribution in the formation of many generations of young artists.

References

External links
Museum of Contemporary Art - Dimitar Avramovski-Pandilov

1898 births
1963 deaths
People from Mavrovo and Rostuša Municipality
People from Manastir vilayet
Macedonian artists
20th-century Macedonian painters